Großer Mittelberg may refer to the following hills and mountains in Germany:

 Großer Mittelberg (Ellrich) (400.1 m), in the Harz near Ellrich, Nordhausen county, Thuringia
 Großer Mittelberg (Haselbach) (633.7 m), in the Thuringian Slate Mountains near Haselbach, Sonneberg county, Thuringia
 Großer Mittelberg (Lonau) (531.0 m), in the Harz near Lonau, Osterode am Harz county, Lower Saxony
 Großer Mittelberg (Mengersgereuth-Hämmern) (687.5 m), in the Thuringian Slate Mountains near Hämmern, Sonneberg county, Thuringia
 Großer Mittelberg (Theuern) (ca. 805 m), in the Thuringian Slate Mountains near Theuern, Sonneberg county, Thuringia
 Großer Mittelberg (Steinach) (649.2 m), in the Thuringian Slate Mountains near Steinach, Sonneberg county, Thuringia